This Life is a British drama television series created by Amy Jenkins and follows the lives of a group of twentysomething law students who share a house in south London. It broadcast on BBC Two from 18 March 1996 to 7 March 1997 for two series and 32 episodes. It returned for a one-off special on 2 January 2007.

Series overview

Episodes

Series 1 (1996)

Series 2 (1997)

Special (2007)

References

This Life